The People's Monarchist Party is a political party in Portugal. It was founded in 1974 by various groups opposing the Estado Novo, in the context of the Carnation Revolution. Currently it is a small monarchist party with little political support. It is known that the claimant to the Portuguese throne, Dom Duarte Pio, Duke of Braganza, does not support this party officially, especially during the period of its leadership by Nuno da Câmara Pereira, a known supporter of the Duke of Loulé’s claim to the throne.

The party had, until 2009, two representatives in the Assembly of the Republic, elected on the lists of the Social Democratic Party, following an agreement with the latter party's leader, Pedro Santana Lopes. In 2009, under the leadership of Câmara Pereira, the party decided to run in the elections of that year on its own, gaining no seats.

The party had not been elected on its own since the dissolution of the Democratic Alliance, of which it was a part, and seldom reached 0.5% of votes.

The People's Monarchist Party is a member of the International Monarchist Conference and the European Christian Political Movement.

Leaders

 Gonçalo Pereira Ribeiro Teles, 1974–1988
 Augusto Martins Ferreira do Amaral, 1988–1990
 Nuno Cardoso da Silva, 1990–1993
 Fernando Manuel Moreira de Sá Monteiro, 1993–1997
 Miguel Jorge Pignatelli de Sena Belo de Queirós e Ataíde, 1997–2005
 Nuno Maria Pacheco da Câmara Pereira, 2005–2010
 Paulo Jorge Abraços Estêvão, 2010–2017
 Gonçalo Maria de Figueiredo Cabral da Camara Pereira, 2017–present

Notable members
 Henrique Barrilaro Ruas
 Francisco Rolão Preto
 Gonçalo Ribeiro Telles
 António Sousa Lara

See also
 Integralismo Lusitano

References

External links
 Official website (in Portuguese)

1974 establishments in Portugal
Conservative parties in Portugal
Eurosceptic parties in Portugal
Monarchist parties in Portugal
Organisations based in Lisbon
Political parties established in 1974
Political parties in Portugal
Social conservative parties
Right-wing parties in Europe
European Christian Political Movement